Philip the Tetrarch (c. 26 BCE. - 34 CE), sometimes called Herod Philip II by modern writers (see "Naming convention"), son of Herod the Great and his fifth wife, Cleopatra of Jerusalem, ruled over the northeast part of his father's kingdom between 4 BCE and 34 CE. He was a half-brother of Herod Antipas and Herod Archelaus and should not be confused with Herod II, whom some writers call Herod Philip I.

Territory
Philip ruled territories which the Gospel of Luke lists as Iturea and Trachonitis and Flavius Josephus lists as Gaulanitis, Trachonitis and Paneas as well as Batanea, Trachonitis, Auranitis, and "a certain part of what is called the House of Zenodorus". The city of Caesarea Philippi served as the capital of his tetrarchy.

Marriage and dynasty
Philip married his niece Salome, the daughter of Herodias and Herod II (sometimes called Herod Philip I, and also a member of the Herodian dynasty). This Salome appears in the Bible in connection with the beheading of John the Baptist. However, there would have been a great difference in their ages: Salome was born in ~14 CE, at which time Herod Philip was 39 years old. The gospels of Matthew and Mark state that the Herodias whom Herod Antipas married was the wife of Antipas' brother "Philip", a fact supported by Josephus, who indicated she was the wife of Herod II (a.k.a. Philip I). It is known that Philip the Tetrarch rebuilt the city of Caesarea Philippi, calling it by his own name to distinguish it from the Caesarea on the sea-coast, which was the seat of the Roman government. It is possible that the 'Salome' he was married to was a half-sister by that same name, a daughter of Herod the Great and his 8th wife Elpis. This sibling Salome was born in ~14 BCE, and so only five years younger than Herod Philip (a more realistic age gap). But this would also be the only known occurrence of the children of Herod the Great intermarrying, even if from different mothers. Marriage to 1st cousins and uncles, however, was relatively common in the so-called Herodian dynasty.

Naming convention
There is no contemporary evidence for Philip the Tetrarch's use of the name "Herod Philip" (Hērōdēs Philippos) as a dynastic title, as did occur with his brothers Herod Antipas and Herod Archelaus. Herod II is sometimes called "Herod Philip I" (because both the Gospel of Matthew and Gospel of Mark call the husband of Herodias "Philip"), and then Philip the Tetrarch is called "Herod Philip II". Kokkinos says, "The stubborn insistence of many theologians in referring to Herod III as 'Herod Philip' is without any value...No illusory Herod Philip ever existed."[pp. 223–233]; [266] Philip the Tetrarch, "unlike his brothers, did not use Herod as a dynastic name." Philip's half-brothers, Archelaus and Antipas, had adopted the name of Herod, "presumably" for a dynastic claim from Herod the Great.

See also
 Herodian dynasty
 Herodian kingdom
 List of biblical figures identified in extra-biblical sources

References

Bibliography

External links
 Philip the Tetrarch entry in historical sourcebook by Mahlon H. Smith
 Herod Philip II biographical entry

20s BC births
34 deaths
1st-century BC Herodian rulers
1st-century Herodian rulers
Herodian dynasty
Jewish royalty
People in the canonical gospels
1st-century BC monarchs in the Middle East
1st-century monarchs in the Middle East
1st-century BCE Jews
1st-century Jews
Salome